Play It Cool may refer to:

 Play It Cool (film), a 1962 British musical starring Billy Fury
 "Play It Cool" (song), by Super Furry Animals
 Play It Cool (Wilber Pan album), 2007
 Play It Cool (Lea DeLaria album), 2001
 Play It Cool (radio show), a BBC Radio comedy from the 1960s
 "Play It Cool", a song by 7L & Esoteric from The Soul Purpose
 "Play It Cool", a song by George Jones from Grand Ole Opry's New Star
 "Play It Cool", a song by Grand Puba from 2000
 "Play It Cool", a song by Münchener Freiheit (band)
 "Play It Cool", a song by Ray Campi
 "Play It Cool", a song by Gangrene featuring Samuel T. Herring and Earl Sweatshirt from Welcome to Los Santos